Youcca Troubetzkoy (12 December 1905 – 22 April 1992), also credited as Youcca Troubetzkov and Nicolas Barclay, was an American actor.

He was a member of the princely Trubetskoy family, son of Prince Nikolai Nikolaievich Troubetzkoy (1867–1949) and the countess Jekaterina Mikhailovna Mussin-Pushkin (1884–1972). His brother, Prince Igor Nikolayevich Troubetzkoy (1912–2008) became a race car driver.

Partial filmography

 Peacock Feathers (1925) as Lionel Clark
 Flower of Night (1925) as John Basset
 The Beautiful Cheat (1926) as Herbert Dangerfield
 Napoleon's Barber (1928) as French Officer
 His Glorious Night (1929) as Von Bergman
 Chasing Rainbows (1930) as Lanning
 The Virtuous Sin (1930) as Capt. Sobakin
 Abduct Me (1932) as Aga
 Cent mille francs pour un baiser (1933; as Nicolas Barclay)
 Idylle au Caire (1933) as Périclès Pietro Cochino
 Moscow Nights (1934) as Capitaine Alev
 The Concierge's Daughters (1934) as Henry Robertson
 The Red Dancer (1937)
 La Loi du nord (1939) as Ellis
 Serge Panine (1939) as Serge Panine
 Savage Brigade (1939) as Boris Mirski

See also
Amélie Rives Troubetsky
Igor Troubetzkoy
Tõnu Trubetsky
Troubetzkoy

References

External links

Youcca Troubetzkoy
Flower of the Night

1905 births
1992 deaths
American male film actors
American male silent film actors
Youcca
Male actors from Los Angeles
American people of Russian descent
20th-century American male actors